The Parliament of Somaliland consists of two chambers:

The House of Elders (Upper Chamber)
The House of Representatives (Lower Chamber)

The current speakership position was established in the 1990s, following the formation of the Somaliland polity. Since August 2021 Abdirizak Khalif is the Speaker of the House of Representatives of Somaliland, while Said Mire Farah is the first deputy speaker and Ali Hamud the second deputy speaker. The speaker of the House of Elders meanwhile is Suleiman Mohamoud Adan, who was elected in 2004.

Somaliland held nationwide elections in May 2021 for the first time in more than 10 years. The Muslim-democratic Waddani party won a plurality in the election but fell short of a majority and allied with the centre-left Justice and Welfare Party to form a majority.

References

Somaliland
Politics of Somaliland
Somaliland